Peaches Jackson (October 9, 1913 – February 23, 2002) was an American film actress. Her sister, Mary Ann Jackson also became a child actor, and appeared in many of the Little Rascals short films for Hal Roach. Peaches (Charlotte) stopped acting regularly in 1925, and later was a dancer in the film Dancing Lady (1933), and It's Great to Be Alive (1933).

Filmography

References

External links

American child actresses
1913 births
2002 deaths
American film actresses
American silent film actresses
20th-century American actresses